Diablo Canyon may refer to:

Diablo Canyon (album), by Outlaws
Diablo Canyon Power Plant, California, U.S.
Diablo Canyon, a feature of Caja del Rio in New Mexico, U.S.
Diablo Canyon, site of Diablo Dam, in Washington, U.S.

See also
Canyon Diablo (disambiguation)